The 1927 Oregon State Aggies football team represented Oregon State University in the Pacific Coast Conference (PCC) during the 1927 college football season.  In their fourth season under head coach Paul J. Schissler, the Beavers compiled a 3–3–1 record (2–3 against PCC opponents), finished in a tie for fifth place in the PCC, and outscored their opponents, 98 to 78. Under coach Schissler, from 1925 to 1932, no team captains were elected.  The team played its home games at Bell Field in Corvallis, Oregon.

Schedule

References

Oregon State
Oregon State Beavers football seasons
Oregon State Aggies football